

Participating Teams
Teams in bold have received byes to this round

Draw 
The draw was made on March 26, 2009 at 22:00 EET. Matches will be settled by a penalty shootout immediately after the match should a tie end in a draw. The stadia were selected by the Libyan Football Federation. The ties will be played between May 1, 2009 and May 6, 2009. If ties are won by the team playing at home, then this team will play away from home against their next opponents in the Round of 16.

Fixtures & Results 
The dates, times and stadia were announced by the Libyan Football Federation on April 28, 2009Division of each club in parentheses

References 

3